Hiroko Kuwata and Riko Sawayanagi were the defending champions, but decided not to participate this year.

Jessica Moore and Storm Sanders won the title, defeating Laura Robson and Erin Routliffe 7–5, 6–2 in the final.

Seeds

Draw

References
Main Draw

Challenger Banque Nationale de Granby
Challenger de Granby